Tisha or Tishah is the Hebrew word for the number nine, as in Tisha B'Av (= 9th of the month Av), an annual fasting day in Judaism.

Tisha is a given name and surname. It is also a diminutive of the Russian masculine name Тихон (Tikhon). Notable persons with that name include:

People with the given name
 Tisha Abundo (born 1949), Philippine sports commissioner
 Tisha Campbell-Martin (born 1968), American actress and singer
 Tisha Martin (21st century), British actress and singer
 Tisha Sterling (born 1944), American actress
 Tisha Terrasini Banker (born 1973), American actress

Mononymous person
 Nusrat Imrose Tisha, Bangladeshi actress and model

See also
 Tish
 Trisha
Letitia

Feminine given names
Masculine given names